The 1940 All-Eastern football team consists of American football players chosen by various selectors as the best players at each position among the Eastern colleges and universities during the 1940 college football season.

All-Eastern selections

Backs
 Walter Matuszczak, Cornell (AP-1)
 Frank Reagan, Penn (AP-1)
 Charlie O'Rourke, Boston College (AP-1)
 George Kracum, Pittsburgh (AP-1)

Ends
 Loren MacKinney, Harvard (AP-1)
 Alan Bartholomy, Yale (AP-1)

Tackles
 Nick Drahos, Cornell (AP-1)
 Joe Ungerer, Fordham (AP-1)

Guards
 George Kerr, Boston College (AP-1)
 Agostino Lio, Georgetown (AP-1)

Centers
 Chet Gladchuk, Boston College (AP-1)

Key
 AP = Associated Press
 UP = United Press
 INS = International News Service
 NEA = Newspaper Enterprise Association

See also
 1940 College Football All-America Team

References

All-Eastern
All-Eastern college football teams